Homalopoma keyurare is a species of sea snail, a marine gastropod mollusk in the family Colloniidae.

Distribution
This marine species occurs off the Philippines..

Original description
 Huang S.-I, Fu I-F. & Poppe G.T. (2016). Taiwanese and Philippine Colloniidae. Nomenclatural remarks and the description of 17 new species (Gastropoda: Colloniidae). Visaya. 4(5): 4-42.
page(s): 17.

References

Colloniidae
Gastropods described in 2016